1841 Masaryk is a carbonaceous background asteroid from the outer region of the asteroid belt, approximately 46 kilometers in diameter. It was discovered on 26 October 1971, by Czech astronomer Luboš Kohoutek at Bergedorf Observatory in Hamburg, Germany. The asteroid was named after the first President of Czechoslovakia, Tomáš Garrigue Masaryk.

Orbit and classification 

Masaryk orbits the Sun in the outer main-belt at a distance of 3.1–3.8 AU once every 6 years and 4 months (2,311 days). Its orbit has an eccentricity of 0.10 and an inclination of 3° with respect to the ecliptic.

Naming 

This minor planet was named in honor of the first president of the independent Czechoslovak Republic, Tomáš Garrigue Masaryk (1850–1937), statesman, philosopher and known for his humanistic ideas. The official  was published by the Minor Planet Center on 20 December 1974.

Physical characteristics 

The carbonaceous asteroid is characterized as a (darker) P-type and as a transitional CX-type by NEOWISE and PanSTARRS, respectively.

Rotation period 

In April 2006, a rotational lightcurve of Masaryk was obtained from photometric observations made by French amateur astronomer Pierre Antonini. It gave a rotation period of 7.53 hours with a brightness variation of 0.52 magnitude. The result agrees with a lightcurve published in March 2016, using sparse-in-time photometry data from the Lowell Photometric Database.

Diameter and albedo 

According to the surveys carried out by the Infrared Astronomical Satellite IRAS, the Japanese Akari satellite, and NASA's Wide-field Infrared Survey Explorer with its subsequent NEOWISE mission, Masaryk measures between 38.6 and 46.1 kilometers in diameter, and its surface has an albedo between 0.039 and 0.057. The Collaborative Asteroid Lightcurve Link derives an albedo of 0.036 and a diameter of 46.0 kilometers with an absolute magnitude of 10.9.

References

External links 
 Asteroid Lightcurve Database (LCDB), query form (info )
 Dictionary of Minor Planet Names, Google books
 Asteroids and comets rotation curves, CdR – Observatoire de Genève, Raoul Behrend
 Discovery Circumstances: Numbered Minor Planets (1)-(5000) – Minor Planet Center
 
 

001841
Discoveries by Luboš Kohoutek
Named minor planets
19711026